Sotero Cayo Miltos Miers (1843, Concepción – 1871, Asunción) was a Paraguayan politician.

He studied in universities in Argentina and Sorbonne. He returned to Paraguay in 1869 and was a political ally of Facundo Machaín and Juan Antonio Jara. After Cirilo Antonio Rivarola was elected as President of the Republic, Miltos was elected as President of Superior Tribunal Court and was also chosen in the commission to write a new constitution, leading the opposition bloc within this body.

On November 24, 1870, he was elected as Vice President, by the National Constitutional Convention, taking office on the next day. He died in office on January 7, 1871, during a yellow fever outbreak.

References

1843 births
1871 deaths
University of Paris alumni
People from Concepción Department, Paraguay
Vice presidents of Paraguay
Paraguayan judges
Paraguayan expatriates in France